Harold Henry "Bev" Beverage (October 14, 1893 – January 27, 1993) was an inventor and researcher in electrical engineering. He is known  for his invention and development of the wave antenna, which came to be known as the Beverage antenna. Less widely known (outside of the community of science history researchers) is that Bev was a pioneer of radio engineering and his engineering research paralleled the development of radio transmission technology throughout his professional career with significant contributions not only in the field of radio frequency antennas but also radio frequency propagation and systems engineering.

Biography 

Harold Beverage was born on October 14, 1893, in North Haven, Maine, to Fremont Beverage and his wife, Lottie Smith. He received a B.S. in Electrical Engineering from the University of Maine in 1915, and went to work for General Electric Company the following year as a radio-laboratory assistant to Dr. Ernst Alexanderson. In 1920, he was placed in charge of developing receivers for transoceanic communications at the Radio Corporation of America in Riverhead, New York. Three years later, at the age of 30, he received the IRE Morris N. Liebmann Memorial Prize "for his work on directional antennas."

RCA named Beverage chief research engineer of communications in 1929, a position he held until 1940. At that time, he was promoted to vice president in charge of research and development at RCA Communications Inc., a subsidiary of the Radio Corporation of America. Beverage retired in 1958 from that position and as director of radio research, but continued to work in communications as a consultant.

In 1938, the Radio Club of America presented him with its Armstrong Medal for his work in the development of antenna systems. The Beverage antenna, the citation said, was "the precursor of wave antennas of all types." Beverage was awarded the IRE Medal of Honor in 1945, "In recognition of his achievements in radio research and invention, of his practical applications of engineering developments that greatly extended and increased the efficiency of domestic and world-wide radio communications and of his devotion to the affairs of the Institute of Radio Engineers." In awarding him its AIEE Lamme Medal in 1956 the American Institute of Electrical Engineers cited him "for his pioneering and outstanding engineering achievements in the conception and application of principles basic to progress in national and worldwide radio communications."

Beverage died on January 27, 1993, at the John T. Mather Hospital in Port Jefferson, L.I. He was 99, and lived in Stony Brook, New York.

List of patents 
 Jun 7, 1921 Radio Receiving System - the Beverage antenna
 Nov 7, 1922 Radio Receiving System - the bidirectional Beverage antenna
 Nov 7, 1922 Radio Receiving System - using a Beverage antenna with multiple receivers
 Nov 7, 1922 Radio Receiving System - a Beverage antenna with selective circuits to eliminate interference from adjacent wavelengths
 Mar 18, 1924 Radio Receiving System - improvements to the directivity of the Beverage Antenna
 Jan 8, 1929 Artificial transmission lines for phasing multiple antennas
 Aug. 5, 1931 Means for testing recorded sound—automatic check film
 Aug. 18,1931 H.H.B. % H.O. Peterson—Means for eliminating fading on high frequencies (filed1/2/26)
 Mar. 15,1932 Frequency modulate or mark/space for AGC (automatic gain control)
 Aug. 30, 1932 Acoustic combining system - mix reflections
 Aug. 30, 1932 Method for eliminating fading—basic rectifier telegraph
 Nov. 15, 1932 Differential volume control for diversity artificial line
 Jul. 11, 1933 H.H.B. & H.O. Peterson—Rotating switch, diversity
 Jul. 11, 1933 H.H.B. & H.O. Peterson—Artificial line pickup delay, diversity
 Jun 12, 1934 Device for reducing the effects of static or fading
 Jul 24, 1934 Aerial System - to be used adjacent to local noise sources
 Jan. 15, 1935 H.H.B. & H.O. Peterson—Means for elimination of fading on short wavelengths
 Feb 5, 1935 Method of testing recorded sound
 Sept. 17, 1935 Remote control system for relay stations
 Dec. 10, 1935 Aerial system—balanced bridge to reduce engine ignition noise of aircraft
 Dec. 24, 1935 Multiplex signaling—commutator and frequency change for multiplex
 Jan. 28, 1936 Receiving system-rectifier high frequency for C.W. Hansell electrolytic recorder
 Mar. 24, 1936 Radio telegraph repeater—electronic, no relays
 Jan. 12, 1937 Radio communication—frequency diversity
 Feb. 9, 1937 H.H.B. & H.O. Peterson—Fading eliminator—different beat notes
 Feb. 6, 1937 Multiplex cable code with diversity receivers
 Apr. 6, 1937 Crystal oscillator monitor for centralized control
 May 25, 1937 Television system—AGC based on density of film
 June 22, 1937 System for radio spectrography, horizontal sync on oscillograph
 Oct, 5, 1937 Signaling-space between carrier and sidebands, phone
 Feb 1, 1938 Relay system - Ultra short radio waves
 Aug. 5, 1938 Centralized control relay stations
 Nov 29, 1938 Phasing and spacing antennas to eliminate undesired reflected rays
 Jan, 17, 1939 Electrical energy measuring system frequency modulation
 Feb 7, 1939 Warren Knotts & H.H.B. -- Frequency assignments for relay stations
 Sept. 191 1939 Amplitude modulation reception—change to phase modulation
 Jul 1, 1941 Broadband Uni-directional Shortwave Antenna
 Sept 9, 1941 System for noise reduction - noise random, signal in phase
 Feb. 3, 1942 Ultra short wave noise elimination—balance local noise vertical suppressor
 Aug 20, 1946 Secrecy system for multiplex telegraphy
 Mar 4, 1947 Radio receiver system for UHF frequencies that removes unintentional frequency modulation from a received signal
 Nov 8, 1949 Radio Relaying System - frequency selection for a chain of relay stations

External links 
Adventures in Cybersound - Harold Henry Beverage, Dr. 1893-1993
IEEE History Center, Legacies, Harold H Beverage 1893-1993
Harold Beverage Interview July 1, 1968
Harold Beverage Interview March 16-17 1992
Harold Henry Beverage - Explorer of the Wavelengths
Radio Pioneer Harold Beverage 2BML
A Letter from Harold Beverage
Photos of Beverage and his Ham Station
AA3PX -Several Photos of Harold Beverage
AA3PX - List of Patents
Spotlight on a Radio Pioneer, Harold H Beverage 1893-1993, Long Island Wireless Historical Society (reprint of an article by J Marshall Etter W2ER in Proceedings of the Radio Club of America Inc.)
The Wave Antenna, A New Type of Highly Directive Antenna, Proceedings of the AIEE, February 1923
Beverage antenna projects

1893 births
1993 deaths
General Electric people
IEEE Medal of Honor recipients
People from North Haven, Maine
University of Maine alumni
People from Stony Brook, New York
20th-century American inventors